Danielle Titus (born 13 August 2002) is a Barbadian swimmer. She competed in the women's 100 metre backstroke at the 2020 Summer Olympics. She competes at the collegiate level for Tulane University.

References

External links
 Tulane Green Wave bio

2002 births
Living people
Barbadian female swimmers
Olympic swimmers of Barbados
Swimmers at the 2020 Summer Olympics
Place of birth missing (living people)
Pan American Games competitors for Barbados
Swimmers at the 2019 Pan American Games
Tulane Green Wave women's swimmers
Swimmers at the 2022 Commonwealth Games
Commonwealth Games competitors for Barbados